Lineodes tipuloides is a moth in the family Crambidae. It was described by Walsingham in 1891. It is found in Trinidad.

References

Moths described in 1891
Spilomelinae